|}

The Land O'Burns Fillies' Stakes is a Listed flat horse race in Great Britain open to mares and fillies aged three years or older.
It is run at Ayr over a distance of 5 furlongs (1,006 metres), and it is scheduled to take place each year in June.

Until 1991 the race was run over 1 mile (1,609 metres). It has been restricted to mares and fillies since 1989.

Records
Most successful horse (2 wins):
 Mecca's Mate - (2005,2007)

Leading jockey (2 wins):
 Nick Connorton – Jungle Gold (1988), Church Light (1989) Robert Winston -  Angels Will Fall (2012), My Propeller (2013)  Paul Mulrennan -  Marsha (2016), Que Amoro (2020)  Tom Eaves -  Hay Chewed (2014), Guilded (2022) Leading trainer (3 wins):
 Henry Candy - Airwave (2004), Spring Fling (2017), Rebecca Rocks (2019) ''

Winners since 1988

See also 
Horse racing in Great Britain
List of British flat horse races

References
 Paris-Turf:
Racing Post:

Flat races in Great Britain
Ayr Racecourse
Sprint category horse races for fillies and mares